Thioperamide is a potent HRH4 antagonist and selective HRH3 antagonist capable of crossing the blood–brain barrier.
It was used by Jean-Charles Schwartz in his early experiments regarding the H3 receptor. Thioperamide was found to be an antagonist of histamine autoreceptors, which negatively regulate the release of histamine, and enhances the activity of histaminergic neurons by blocking autoreceptors, leading to greater release of histamine.

Its action on H3 is thought to promote wakefulness and improve memory consolidation.

See also 
 H3 receptor antagonist

References 

H3 receptor antagonists
Thioureas
Piperidines
Imidazoles
Cyclohexyl compounds